Alberto Berasategui was the defending champion, but lost in the second round to Nicolás Lapentti.

Richard Fromberg won the title by defeating Andrea Gaudenzi 6–1, 7–6(7–2) in the final.

Seeds

Draw

Finals

Top half

Bottom half

References

External links
 Official results archive (ATP)
 Official results archive (ITF)

1997 Singles
Singles
1997 in Romanian tennis